Jumgal is a district of Naryn Region in central Kyrgyzstan. The administrative seat lies at Chaek. It is a mountainous district. Its main rivers are the Kökömeren (a tributary to the river Naryn) and its tributaries Jumgal, Suusamyr and Batysh Karakol.

Population

Populated places
In total, Jumgal District include 30 settlements in 13 rural communities. Each rural community includes one or several villages. The rural communities and settlements in the Jumgal District are as follows:

 Bash-Kuugandy (seat: Bash-Kuugandy)
 Bayzak (seat: Bayzak)
 Chaek (seat: Chaek; incl. Ak-Tatyr, Besh-Terek, Chukur-Akseki and Shorton)
 Chong-Döbö (seat: Chong-Döbö)
 Jangy-Aryk (seat: Jangy-Aryk; incl. Bazar-Turuk, Kyzart and Kyzyl-Emgek)
 Jumgal (seat: Jumgal; incl. Lama)
 Kabak (seat: Tabylgyty; incl. Aral, Keng-Suu, Kotur-Suu, Kyzyl-Korgon, Sary-Bulung and Tabylgy)
 Kök-Oy (seat: Kök-Oy; incl. Kichi-Aral)
 Kuyruchuk (seat: Kuyruchuk)
 Kyzyl-Jyldyz (seat: Kyzyl-Jyldyz)
 Ming-Kush (seat: Ming-Kush; incl. Kyzyl-Söök)
 Süyümbay (seat: Tash-Döbö)
 Tügöl-Say (seat: Tügöl-Say; incl. Epkin)

References 

Districts of Naryn Region